Garhwal may refer to the following topics associated with Uttarakhand, India:

Places 

Garhwal Himalaya, a sub-range of the Himalayas
Garhwal Kingdom, a former kingdom
Garhwal District (British Garhwal), a former district of British India
Garhwal division, a modern administrative division
Pauri Garhwal district, a district in the division
Tehri Garhwal district, a district in the division
Garhwal (Lok Sabha constituency), a parliamentary constituency

Other uses 
Garhwal F.C., an Indian football club from New Delhi
The Garhwal Rifles, a regiment of the Indian army
Garhwal University, a university in Srinagar, Uttarakhand

See also
Garhwali (disambiguation)
Gadwal, a town in Telangana, India
Gharwali Baharwali, an Indian comedy drama film